The Reinforced Concrete Association was a British engineering organisation. Many important British buildings in the twentieth century were made from reinforced concrete.

Function
It produced the journal Structural Concrete.

Presidents
 1956–57, Sir Frederick Snow

Structure
In the 1930s it has headquartered on Dartmouth Street in London, then moved to Petty France, London in the 1950s.

References

Construction organizations
Organisations based in the City of Westminster
Reinforced concrete